Lawrencium is a synthetic chemical element with the symbol Lr (formerly Lw) and atomic number 103. It is named in honor of Ernest Lawrence, inventor of the cyclotron, a device that was used to discover many artificial radioactive elements. A radioactive metal, lawrencium is the eleventh transuranic element and the last member of the actinide series. Like all elements with atomic number over 100, lawrencium can only be produced in particle accelerators by bombarding lighter elements with charged particles. Fourteen isotopes of lawrencium are currently known; the most stable is 266Lr with half-life 11 hours, but the shorter-lived 260Lr (half-life 2.7 minutes) is most commonly used in chemistry because it can be produced on a larger scale.

Chemistry experiments confirm that lawrencium behaves as a heavier homolog to lutetium in the periodic table, and is a trivalent element. It thus could also be classified as the first of the 7th-period transition metals: however, its electron configuration is anomalous for its position in the periodic table, having an s2p configuration instead of the s2d configuration of its homolog lutetium. This means that lawrencium may be more volatile than expected for its position in the periodic table and have a volatility comparable to that of lead.

In the 1950s, 1960s, and 1970s, many claims of the synthesis of lawrencium of varying quality were made from laboratories in the Soviet Union and the United States. The priority of the discovery and therefore the name of the element was disputed between Soviet and American scientists, and while the International Union of Pure and Applied Chemistry (IUPAC) initially established lawrencium as the official name for the element and gave the American team credit for the discovery, this was reevaluated in 1997, giving both teams shared credit for the discovery but not changing the element's name.

Introduction

History

In 1958, scientists at Lawrence Berkeley National Laboratory claimed the discovery of element 102, now called nobelium. At the same time, they also tried to synthesize element 103 by bombarding the same curium target used with nitrogen-14 ions. While the data agrees reasonably with that later discovered for 257Lr (alpha decay energy 8.87 MeV, half-life 0.6 s), the evidence obtained in this experiment fell far short of the strength required to conclusively demonstrate synthesis of element 103. A follow-up on this experiment was not done, as the target was destroyed. Later, in 1960, the Lawrence Berkeley Laboratory attempted to synthesize the element by bombarding 252Cf with 10B and 11B. The results of this experiment were not conclusive.

The first important work on element 103 was done at Berkeley by the nuclear-physics team of Albert Ghiorso, Torbjørn Sikkeland, Almon Larsh, Robert M. Latimer, and their co-workers on February 14, 1961. The first atoms of lawrencium were reportedly made by bombarding a three-milligram target consisting of three isotopes of californium with boron-10 and boron-11 nuclei from the Heavy Ion Linear Accelerator (HILAC). This identification was later corrected to 258103, as later work proved that 257Lr did not have the properties detected, but 258Lr did. This was considered at the time to be convincing proof of synthesis of element 103: while the mass assignment was less certain and proved to be mistaken, it did not affect the arguments in favor of element 103 having been synthesized. Scientists at Joint Institute for Nuclear Research in Dubna (then in the Soviet Union) raised several criticisms: all but one were answered adequately. The exception was that 252Cf was the most common isotope in the target, and in the reactions with 10B, 258Lr could only have been produced by emitting four neutrons, and emitting three neutrons was expected to be much less likely than emitting four or five. This would lead to a narrow yield curve, not the broad one reported by the Berkeley team. A possible explanation was that there was a low number of events attributed to element 103. This was an important intermediate step to the unquestioned discovery of element 103, although the evidence was not completely convincing. The Berkeley team proposed the name "lawrencium" with symbol "Lw", after Ernest Lawrence, inventor of the cyclotron. The IUPAC Commission on Nomenclature of Inorganic Chemistry accepted the name, but changed the symbol to "Lr". This acceptance of the discovery was later characterized as being hasty by the Dubna team.

 +  → * →  + 5 

The first work at Dubna on element 103 came in 1965, when they reported to have made 256103 in 1965 by bombarding 243Am with 18O, identifying it indirectly from its granddaughter fermium-252. The half-life they reported was somewhat too high, possibly due to background events. Later 1967 work on the same reaction identified two decay energies in the ranges 8.35–8.50 MeV and 8.50–8.60 MeV: these were assigned to 256103 and 257103. Despite repeat attempts, they were unable to confirm assignment of an alpha emitter with a half-life of 8 seconds to 257103. The Russians proposed the name "rutherfordium" for the new element in 1967: this name was later proposed by Berkeley for element 104.

 +  → * →  + 5 

Further experiments in 1969 at Dubna and in 1970 at Berkeley demonstrated an actinide chemistry for the new element; so by 1970 it was known that element 103 is the last actinide. In 1970, the Dubna group reported the synthesis of 255103 with half-life 20 s and alpha decay energy 8.38 MeV. However, it was not until 1971, when the nuclear physics team at University of California at Berkeley successfully did a whole series of experiments aimed at measuring the nuclear decay properties of the lawrencium isotopes with mass numbers 255 to 260, that all previous results from Berkeley and Dubna were confirmed, apart from the Berkeley's group initial erroneous assignment of their first produced isotope to 257103 instead of the probably correct 258103. All final doubts were dispelled in 1976 and 1977 when the energies of X-rays emitted from 258103 were measured.

In 1971, the IUPAC granted the discovery of lawrencium to the Lawrence Berkeley Laboratory, even though they did not have ideal data for the element's existence. But in 1992, the IUPAC Transfermium Working Group (TWG) officially recognized the nuclear physics teams at Dubna and Berkeley as co-discoverers of lawrencium, concluding that while the 1961 Berkeley experiments were an important step to lawrencium's discovery, they were not yet fully convincing; and while the 1965, 1968, and 1970 Dubna experiments came very close to the needed level of confidence taken together, only the 1971 Berkeley experiments, which clarified and confirmed previous observations, finally resulted in complete confidence in the discovery of element 103. Because the name "lawrencium" had been in use for a long time by this point, it was retained by IUPAC, and in August 1997, the International Union of Pure and Applied Chemistry (IUPAC) ratified the name lawrencium and the symbol "Lr" during a meeting in Geneva.

Characteristics

Physical
Lawrencium is the last actinide. Authors considering the subject generally consider it a group 3 element, along with scandium, yttrium, and lutetium, as its filled f-shell is expected to make it resemble the other 7th-period transition metals. In the periodic table, it is to the right of the actinide nobelium, to the left of the 6d transition metal rutherfordium, and under the lanthanide lutetium with which it shares many physical and chemical properties. Lawrencium is expected to be a solid under normal conditions and have a hexagonal close-packed crystal structure (c/a = 1.58), similar to its lighter congener lutetium, though this is not yet known experimentally. The enthalpy of sublimation of lawrencium is estimated at 352 kJ/mol, close to the value of lutetium and strongly suggesting that metallic lawrencium is trivalent with three electrons delocalized, a prediction also supported by a systematic extrapolation of the values of heat of vaporization, bulk modulus, and atomic volume of neighboring elements to lawrencium: this makes it unlike the immediately preceding late actinides which are known to be (fermium and mendelevium) or expected to be (nobelium) divalent. The estimated enthalpies of vaporization show that lawrencium deviates from the trend of the late actinides and instead matches the trend of the succeeding 6d elements rutherfordium and dubnium, consistent with lawrencium's interpretation as a group 3 element. Some scientists prefer to end the actinides with nobelium and consider lawrencium to be the first transition metal of the seventh period.

Specifically, lawrencium is expected to be a trivalent, silvery metal, easily oxidized by air, steam, and acids, and having an atomic volume similar to that of lutetium and a trivalent metallic radius of 171 pm. It is expected to be a rather heavy metal with a density of around 14.4 g/cm3. It is also predicted to have a melting point of around 1900 K (1627 °C), not far from the value for lutetium (1925 K).

Chemical

It was not until decades later that element 103 was finally conclusively synthesized and this prediction was experimentally confirmed.

1969 studies on the element showed that lawrencium reacts with chlorine to form a product that was most likely the trichloride, . Its volatility was found to be similar to the chlorides of curium, fermium, and nobelium and much less than that of rutherfordium chloride. In 1970, chemical studies were performed on 1500 atoms of 256Lr, comparing it with divalent (No, Ba, Ra), trivalent (Fm, Cf, Cm, Am, Ac), and tetravalent (Th, Pu) elements. Lawrencium occurs as the trivalent  ion in aqueous solution and hence its compounds should be similar to those of the other trivalent actinides: for example, lawrencium(III) fluoride and hydroxide should both be insoluble in water. It was also found that the actinide contraction at the end of the actinides was larger than the analogous lanthanide contraction, with the exception of the last actinide, lawrencium: the cause was speculated to be relativistic effects.

It has been speculated that the 7s electrons are relativistically stabilized, so that in reducing conditions, only the 7p1/2 electron would be ionized, leading to the monovalent  ion. On the basis of this, the standard electrode potential of the E°() couple was calculated to be less than −1.56 V, indicating that the existence of  ions in aqueous solution was unlikely. The upper limit for the E°() couple was predicted to be −0.44 V: the values for E°() and E°() are predicted to be −2.06 V and +7.9 V. The stability of the group oxidation state in the 6d transition series decreases as RfIV > DbV > SgVI, and lawrencium continues the trend with LrIII being more stable than RfIV.

In the molecule lawrencium dihydride, which is predicted to be bent, the 6d orbital of lawrencium is not expected to play a role in the bonding, unlike that of lanthanum dihydride.  has La–H bond distances of 2.158 Å, while  should have shorter Lr–H bond distances of 2.042 Å due to the relativistic contraction and stabilization of the 7s and 7p orbitals involved in the bonding, in contrast to the core-like 5f subshell and the mostly uninvolved 6d subshell. In general, molecular  and LrH are expected to resemble the corresponding thallium species (thallium having a 6s26p1 valence configuration in the gas phase, like lawrencium's 7s27p1) more than the corresponding lanthanide species. However, in species where all three valence electrons of lawrencium are ionized to give at least formally the  cation, lawrencium is expected to behave like a typical actinide and the heavier congener of lutetium, especially because the first three ionization potentials of lawrencium are predicted to be similar to those of lutetium. Hence, unlike thallium but like lutetium, lawrencium would prefer to form  than LrH, and LrCO is expected to be similar to the also unknown LuCO, both metals having valence configuration σ2π1 in their monocarbonyls. The complex anion  is expected to be stable with a configuration of 6d1 for lawrencium; this 6d orbital would be its highest occupied molecular orbital. This is analogous to the electronic structure of the analogous lutetium compound.

Atomic
Lawrencium has three valence electrons: the 5f electrons are in the atomic core. In 1970, it was predicted that the ground-state electron configuration of lawrencium was [Rn]5f146d17s2 (ground state term symbol 2D3/2), per the Aufbau principle and conforming to the [Xe]4f145d16s2 configuration of lawrencium's lighter homolog lutetium. But the next year, calculations were published that questioned this prediction, instead expecting an anomalous [Rn]5f147s27p1 configuration. Though early calculations gave conflicting results, more recent studies and calculations confirm the s2p suggestion. 1974 relativistic calculations concluded that the energy difference between the two configurations was small and that it was uncertain which was the ground state. Later 1995 calculations concluded that the s2p configuration should be energetically favored, because the spherical s and p1/2 orbitals are nearest to the atomic nucleus and thus move quickly enough that their relativistic mass increases significantly.

In 1988, a team of scientists led by Eichler calculated that lawrencium's enthalpy of adsorption on metal sources would differ enough depending on its electron configuration that it would be feasible to carry out experiments to exploit this fact to measure lawrencium's electron configuration. The s2p configuration was expected to be more volatile than the s2d configuration, and be more similar to that of the p-block element lead. No evidence for lawrencium being volatile was obtained and the lower limit for the enthalpy of adsorption of lawrencium on quartz or platinum was significantly higher than the estimated value for the s2p configuration.

In 2015, the first ionization energy of lawrencium was measured, using the isotope 256Lr. The measured value, agreed very well with the relativistic theoretical prediction of 4.963(15) eV, and also provided a first step into measuring the first ionization energies of the transactinides. This value is the lowest among all the lanthanides and actinides, and supports the s2p configuration as the 7p1/2 electron is expected to be only weakly bound. As ionisation energies generally increase left to right in the f-block, this low value suggests that lutetium and lawrencium belong in the d-block (whose trend they follow) and not the f-block. That would make them the heavier congeners of scandium and yttrium, rather than lanthanum and actinium. Although some alkali metal-like behaviour has been predicted, adsorption experiments suggest that lawrencium is trivalent like scandium and yttrium, not monovalent like the alkali metals. A lower limit on lawrencium's second ionization energy (>13.3 eV) was experimentally found in 2021.

Even though s2p is now known to be the ground-state configuration of the lawrencium atom, ds2 should be a low-lying excited-state configuration, with an excitation energy variously calculated as 0.156 eV, 0.165 eV, or 0.626 eV. As such lawrencium may still be considered to be a d-block element, albeit with an anomalous electron configuration (like chromium or copper), as its chemical behaviour matches expectations for a heavier analogue of lutetium.

Isotopes

Fourteen isotopes of lawrencium are known, with mass number 251–262, 264, and 266; all are radioactive. Seven nuclear isomers are known. The longest-lived isotope, 266Lr, has a half-life of about ten hours and is one of the longest-lived superheavy isotopes known to date. However, shorter-lived isotopes are usually used in chemical experiments because 266Lr currently can only be produced as a final decay product of even heavier and harder-to-make elements: it was discovered in 2014 in the decay chain of 294Ts. 256Lr (half-life 27 seconds) was used in the first chemical studies on lawrencium: currently, the longer-lived 260Lr (half-life 2.7 minutes) is usually used for this purpose. After 266Lr, the longest-lived isotopes are 264Lr, 262Lr (3.6 h), and 261Lr (44 min). All other known lawrencium isotopes have half-lives under 5 minutes, and the shortest-lived of them (251Lr) has a half-life of 24.4 milliseconds. The half-lives of lawrencium isotopes mostly increase smoothly from 251Lr to 266Lr, with a dip from 257Lr to 259Lr.

Preparation and purification
Most isotopes of lawrencium can be produced by bombarding actinide (americium to einsteinium) targets with light ions (from boron to neon). The two most important isotopes, 256Lr and 260Lr, can be respectively produced by bombarding californium-249 with 70 MeV boron-11 ions (producing lawrencium-256 and four neutrons) and by bombarding berkelium-249 with oxygen-18 (producing lawrencium-260, an alpha particle, and three neutrons). The two heaviest and longest-lived known isotopes, 264Lr and 266Lr, can only be produced at much lower yields as decay products of dubnium, whose progenitors are isotopes of moscovium and tennessine.

Both 256Lr and 260Lr have half-lives too short to allow a complete chemical purification process. Early experiments with 256Lr therefore used rapid solvent extraction, with the chelating agent thenoyltrifluoroacetone (TTA) dissolved in methyl isobutyl ketone (MIBK) as the organic phase, and with the aqueous phase being buffered acetate solutions. Ions of different charge (+2, +3, or +4) will then extract into the organic phase under different pH ranges, but this method will not separate the trivalent actinides and thus 256Lr must be identified by its emitted 8.24 MeV alpha particles. More recent methods have allowed rapid selective elution with α-HIB to take place in enough time to separate out the longer-lived isotope 260Lr, which can be removed from the catcher foil with 0.05 M hydrochloric acid.

See also

Notes

References

Bibliography

External links
 
 Los Alamos National Laboratory's Chemistry Division: Periodic Table – Lawrencium
 Lawrencium at The Periodic Table of Videos (University of Nottingham)

 
Chemical elements
Transition metals
Actinides
Synthetic elements
Chemical elements with hexagonal close-packed structure